Independent television can refer to: 
 Africa Independent Television, a Nigerian satellite television station 
 Independent Television (Bangladesh), a Bangladeshi 24/7 news channel
 Independent Television, a British television network:
 ITV (TV network), Independent Television, a television network covering the United Kingdom, the Isle of Man and the Channel Islands
 ITV (TV channel), a brand name used by ITV plc for twelve franchises of the ITV Network covering England, Southern Scotland, Wales, the Isle of Man and the Channel Islands
 ITV Digital, a UK digital terrestrial TV broadcaster, which opened in 1998 as ONdigital and closed in 2002
 ITV plc, a British company which owns thirteen of the fifteen ITV Network franchises
 ITV Studios, a production company owned by ITV plc
 itv.com, the main website of ITV plc
 Independent station, a terrestrial television station not affiliated to networks
 ION Television, previously called i: Independent Television
 Televisão Independente, a Portuguese television channel
 Independent TV (India), Indian direct to home operator
 Independent Television Network, a Sri Lankan state-owned broadcaster
 Network 10, an Australian television network launched as Independent Television System